Rivalries in the Australian Football League exist between many teams, most of which typically draw large crowds and interest regardless of both teams' positions on the ladder. The AFL encourages the building of such rivalries, as a method of increasing publicity for the league, to the point of designating one round each year as "Rivalry Round" when many of these match-ups are held on the one weekend. Whilst some rivalries, such as between teams from adjacent areas, are still strong, the designation of an entire round of fixtures as a Rivalry Round is often criticised due to some arbitrary match-ups, or ignoring stronger and more recent rivalries.

With a 23-game season and 18 teams (16 teams from 1995 until 2010 with the introduction of the Gold Coast Football Club and the Greater Western Sydney Giants in 2011 and 2012 respectively), the AFL fixtures are not equal with each team playing seven other teams twice and eight teams once. Choosing to play certain games twice, such as the local derbies and blockbusters (games between the "Big 4" Victorian clubs of Collingwood, Carlton, Essendon and Richmond, are known as "blockbuster" games), results in a skewed fixture which is rarely evened out over time.

Victorian rivalries

Carlton v Collingwood

Argued by some to be the greatest and longest-standing rivalry in the competition. Two clubs in close proximity, fuelled by the rivalry between white (Carlton) and blue collar (Collingwood) suburbs; the rivalry is intensified because the teams have met in six memorable grand finals (Carlton winning five, Collingwood one), including Carlton's 44-point comeback in 1970, and the famous Harmes-Sheldon goal in 1979. Games between these two clubs regularly attract large crowds regardless of whether they are in finals contention or not.

Essendon v Carlton

As is the case with two successful sides in any competition, fans of each club love to defeat the other. The two clubs share the record for the most premierships with 16, with the clubs meeting in 6 grand finals ( with each team having won 3 flags against the other) including a 1-point victory by Carlton against Essendon in 1947 and a drought-breaking flag in 1968 in which Carlton became the first team to have kicked fewer goals than the loser.

In the 1980s and 1990s, the rivalry went to new levels with the two teams competing in several memorable contests. In 1981 the clubs would meet in the Escort cup grand final which Essendon would win. Later on in the season in Round 20 in 1981, with Carlton leading by 26 points with 10 minutes left to play, with goals from Neale Danniher helping get the Bombers across the line by 1 point. The game is most famous for Carlton skipper Mike Fitzpatrick having the ball taken off him for wasting time. In 1993 Carlton and Essendon met in quite a few memorable affairs, including the 1993 Grand Final in which the Baby Bombers got up to win the game by 44 points against a favoured Carlton side most remembered for Michael Longs dashing goal in the first quarter, a few weeks earlier the Blues had beaten the Bombers in the first night qualifying final by 2 points and in round 2 the two teams both drew the game, after Stephen Kernahan had a chance to win the game for Carlton only to kick it out on the full in what was the highest draw game in AFL/VFL history. Carlton famously upset the heavily favoured Essendon side by 1 point in the 1999 Preliminary Final.

In 2007 Essendon led Carlton by 48 points deep into the second quarter of their Round 3 2007 match at the MCG, only to be overrun by Carlton in what would go down as their greatest ever come from behind victory; however, Essendon went on to defeat Carlton over the next 6 encounters, with Carlton finally breaking Essendon's winning streak with an emphatic 76 point win in Round 19, 2010.

Following the 2000 Preliminary final the two teams would not meet in a final until the 2011 Elimination Final and would be Carlton's first finals win in 10 years. In 2018 after Carlton's worst start to the season in the club's 121 years in the competition, the Blues would secure their first win for the season in Round 8 against Essendon. In 2022 Essendon celebrated their 150th anniversary against Carlton at the MCG, unfortunately for Essendon the blues spoilt the party winning by 26 points.

Melbourne v Collingwood

A traditional white collar (Melbourne) v blue collar (Collingwood) rivalry, additionally fuelled by a loss to Collingwood which stopped Melbourne from winning a fourth flag in a row in 1958 and Melbourne restricting Collingwood to 14 points in the 1960 grand final. Six of Melbourne's thirteen premierships came against Collingwood and the teams have met in seven grand finals, the most of any pairing. Since 2001, Melbourne has hosted Collingwood in an annual match at the MCG on the Queen's Birthday public holiday Monday in June.

Richmond v Collingwood

Arising from the fact that the two areas neighbour each other, Richmond and Collingwood were both highly successful in the late 1920s to the early 1930s; the clubs played against each other in five grand finals between 1919 and 1929 (Collingwood won in 1919, 1927, 1928 and 1929, while Richmond won in 1920). In the 1980 Grand Final, Richmond handed Collingwood an 81-point defeat, a record at the time, causing Collingwood to lose an 8th Grand Finals in a row.

Both clubs continue to draw large crowds to their meetings in each season, and the two were the subject of a 'recruiting war' throughout the 1970s and 1980s, with David Cloke, Geoff Raines, Brian Taylor, Wally Lovett, Phillip Walsh, Steven Roach, Gerald Betts, Neil Peart, Peter McCormack, Kevin Morris, Craig Stewart, Ross Brewer, Michael Lockman, Rod Oborne, Allan Edwards, John Annear, Noel Lovell and Bob Heard all exchanging clubs, as well as coach Tom Hafey (moving to Collingwood in 1977 following four flags at Punt Road).

Melees have been fought between the teams in two recent matches—Round 20, 2009, and Round 2, 2012—with almost all players from both teams involved in the altercations.

Both teams played each other 3 times during 2018, with all three games attracting massive crowds. Crowds of 72,157 and 88,180 were recorded between both home-and-away games, with Richmond winning both times, until Collingwood unexpectedly pulled off a massive upset in their finals game, smashing Richmond in the preliminary final in front of a crowd of 94,959, which caused the rivalry to reach its highest point since 1980. Games between these two clubs regularly attract large crowds regardless of whether they are in finals contention or not.

Hawthorn v Essendon

The clubs contested the grand final in three consecutive seasons between 1983 and 1985, and the rough nature of these games and other matches between the clubs made them strong rivals during the 1980s. In 1992, Hawthorn inflicted a record MCG score of 32.24 (216) against Essendon. In the 2000s, the clubs have played two matches which saw bench-clearing brawls: the "Line in the Sand Match" in 2004, which resulted in four players being suspended and $70,700 in fines; and the final round of 2009, a match which would decide eighth place between the two teams, in which four players were suspended for a total of seven matches and $27,000 in fines being handed out. The latter brawl was famously sparked by Matthew Lloyd, who applied a very hard bump that knocked out Brad Sewell in what would be Lloyd's last game.

Richmond v Carlton
A rivalry based on geographical proximity and large supporter bases, the rivalry intensified as both clubs contested several grand finals between 1969 and 1982, including the 1972 Grand Final where Richmond equalled the highest score ever in a grand final, only to be bettered by Carlton in the same match. The following year Richmond won the 1973 Grand Final in an even more physically bitter contest than in recent encounters between the two sides; Carlton got their revenge in 1982 by defeating Richmond in their last grand final appearance until their win over Adelaide in 2017. In 2013, Carlton beat Richmond by 20 points in an elimination final, which was Richmond's first final since 2001, and third final since 1982.

Since 2008, the two clubs have met annually on a Thursday night in Round 1 of each season at the Melbourne Cricket Ground, which is usually but not always the opening game of the premiership season, and draws an average crowd of 80,000. A record crowd of 94,690 attended the 2013 Elimination Final between these two traditional rivals. It was the largest crowd for the 2013 season excluding the grand final, and the largest week one finals crowd since 1972.
Carlton has also received more finals losses (16) to Richmond than any other team. Richmond has also inflicted a total of four grand final losses on Carlton (1921, 1932, 1969 and 1973). Carlton has only beaten Richmond in two grand finals (1972 and 1982). Games between these two clubs regularly attract large crowds regardless of whether they are in finals contention or not.

Essendon v Collingwood

Since 1995, the rivalry has been defined by the Anzac Day clash; a match generally draws a crowd in excess of 90,000. The inaugural Anzac Day Clash in 1995 was famously drawn, the 2009 match was won by Essendon in the final minute with a goal from youngster David Zaharakis, and the 2012 match was won by Collingwood by one point after Jarryd Blair's game-winning goal was reviewed by video replay before being awarded.

Essendon v Richmond

A rivalry born out of the fact that the two clubs are both part of the "Big 4" clubs in Melbourne as the highly supported teams. Since 2005, Essendon and Richmond have contested the annual Dreamtime at the 'G match, a celebration of Aboriginal players and their contribution to the league, typically held near the midway point of the season. These games usually tend to get a crowd of 80,000 or above.

North Melbourne v Hawthorn
Both teams entered the VFL in the 1925 expansion, and were generally unsuccessful through the first few decades, but the two teams were both very strong through the 1970s, sparking a rivalry between the clubs. The clubs played three Grand Finals against each other in four years, with North Melbourne winning their first-ever premiership in 1975 by 55 points, Hawthorn winning in 1976 by five goals, and Hawthorn winning in 1978 by three goals.

Melees have been fought between the two teams in recent matches—Round 16, 2014, and Round 5, 2015—with almost all players in both teams involved in the altercations.

Hawthorn v Geelong

The rivalry between these two clubs is noted as creating a propensity for close matches, with a number of well-known, controversial incidents arising from this rivalry. The rivalry between the two clubs has been called the “greatest modern-day rivalry”. The AFL has a lock on fixturing a match between these two teams on Easter Monday at the MCG.

History

Bruns incident

While Hawthorn and Geelong had previously played against each other in several high-profile matches, including the 1963 Grand Final, the rivalry between the two teams is widely held to have begun in their round 12 match during the 1985 season. During the match, Hawthorn star Leigh Matthews struck Geelong player Neville Bruns in the jaw, breaking it and causing Bruns to miss five games. Matthews was deregistered by the AFL for a month for the incident, and became the only player in the history of the VFL/AFL to be charged with criminal offences for an act committed on-field. He was given a $1000 fine, which was overturned on appeal. The incident caused both players to be booed by fans of the opposing teams for the rest of their careers.

1989 grand final

The 1989 grand final, contested between the two clubs, was what solidified their rivalry. The game, noted for its extreme brutality, is widely considered one of the best Grand Finals in VFL/AFL history. Earlier in the season, Hawthorn's Dermott Brereton had damaged one of Mark Yeates's testicles during a tackle. Within seconds of the game starting, Brereton was flattened by a bump from Yates. He proceeded to get up, vomit, and continued to play. This was one of many examples of Geelong 'playing the man', resulting in major injuries for several Hawks players during the game. Hawthorn controlled the game, leading by approximately 40 points for most of the match; in the last quarter, Geelong almost managed to come from behind to win, but fell short by six points.

2008 grand final
In the 2008 AFL Grand Final, Geelong was the heavily backed favourite and had lost only one match for the season, but Hawthorn upset Geelong by 26 points; Geelong won its next eleven matches against Hawthorn over the following five years, under a curse, which was dubbed the "Kennett curse" which was attributed to disrespectful comments made by Hawthorn president Jeff Kennett following the 2008 Grand Final. It was later revealed that after the 2008 grand final, Paul Chapman initiated a pact between other Geelong players to never lose to Hawthorn again. The curse was broken in a preliminary final in 2013, after Paul Chapman played his final match for Geelong the previous week.

Essendon v North Melbourne

A long-standing rivalry between North Melbourne and Essendon in the AFL can be traced back to 1896, when several clubs, including Essendon, broke away from the Victorian Football Association (VFA) to form the Victorian Football League (VFL). North Melbourne sought to join the breakaway competition, but some argue this desire was not realised due to Essendon feeling threatened by North Melbourne's proximity and the fact their inclusion could drain Essendon of vital talent. Until as late as the 1920s, Essendon largely represented the North Melbourne area in the VFL, with the majority of its members coming from North Melbourne, West Melbourne and Kensington. The two clubs almost amalgamated in 1921 when Essendon, evicted from its home ground at East Melbourne, sought to move to North Melbourne's home at Arden Street, a move which was blocked by the VFA.

North Melbourne was finally admitted into the VFL in 1925. In 1950, the two sides met in their first and only grand final meeting to date, which Essendon won by 38 points. The rivalry flared in the 1980s. In 1982, the Krakouer brothers, Jim and Phil, led the Roos to an elimination final win. Essendon had their revenge a year later, winning a preliminary final by 86 points.

The rivalry was reignited in the late 1990s and early 2000s due to the onfield success of the two sides. In preparation for the 1998 finals series, and despite losing six of their last eight to the Roos, Essendon coach Kevin Sheedy publicly labelled North executives Greg Miller and Mark Dawson as "soft" in response to comments from commentators that his Essendon team was soft. The Kangaroos beat Essendon in the much-hyped encounter that followed (a qualifying final), and North fans pelted Sheedy with marshmallows as he left the ground, although Sheedy was seemingly unfazed by the incident, encouraging a "Marshmallow Game" the next year and relishing in the fact that Sheedy's ulterior motive was to build up the game and draw a large crowd, which proved to be correct, drawing in 71,154 people to attend the game. In 2000, the Bombers thrashed North Melbourne by 125 points in a qualifying final. The biggest VFL/AFL comeback of all time occurred between the two teams when Essendon managed to come back from a 69-point deficit to win by 12 points in 2001. A meeting of the two rivals at the MCG in the 2014 AFL finals series in the 2nd Elimination Final resulted in North winning by 12 points.

Collingwood v Geelong
Geelong won their first flag in 1925 over Collingwood, in 1930 Collingwood defeated Geelong in the grand final making it four flags in-a-row for the Pies. Geelong would later deny Collingwood three successive premierships in 1937, winning a famous grand final by 32 points.

The two sides played against each other in 6 finals between 1951 and 1955, including the 1952 Grand Final when Geelong easily beat Collingwood by 46 points. In 1953, Collingwood ended Geelong's record 23-game winning streak in the home and away season, and later defeated them by 12 points in the grand final, denying the Cats a third successive premiership.

Since 2007, the clubs have again both been at the top of the ladder and have met regularly in finals. Geelong won a memorable preliminary final by five points on their way to their first flag in 44 years. In 2008, Collingwood inflicted Geelong's only home-and-away loss, by a massive 86 points, but the teams did not meet in the finals. They would meet in preliminary finals in 2009 and 2010, each winning one en route to a premiership. They finally met in a Grand Final in 2011, which Geelong won by 38 points; Geelong inflicted Collingwood's only three losses for the 2011 season.

Interstate rivalries

Essendon v West Coast 
A three-decade rivalry between the Essendon Bombers and the West Coast Eagles started when Essendon coach Kevin Sheedy tied the windsock down on the School End outer terrace so the opposition would not know which way the wind was blowing. Sheedy later said of the incident three decades later, in jest, that it was because the brand sponsor had neglected to pay their account. When West Coast won the toss and kicked against the breeze, it looked as if Sheedy’s plan had worked. Nevertheless, West Coast would go on to win by 7 points.

In his excitement at winning a close match in Round 16, 1993, with ruckman and forward Paul Salmon kicking a goal 30 seconds before the final siren against the West Coast Eagles (the reigning premiers), Sheedy waved his jacket in the air as he came rushing from the coaches' box. To this day, the supporters of the winning club wave their jackets in the air after the game when the two teams play. The moment is captured in Jamie Cooper's painting the Game That Made Australia, commissioned by the AFL in 2008 to celebrate the 150th anniversary of the sport, with Sheedy shown waving a red, black and yellow jacket rather than a red and black jacket, to reflect Sheedy's support of indigenous footballers. The Bombers would go on to defeat West Coast again later that year in their Semi-Final clash and take home the 1993 premiership cup a couple of weeks later.

Despite Sheedy's typically measured disposition, Sheedy did lose his cool on one occasion in 2000. In yet another game against the Eagles, Sheedy was fined $7,500 by the tribunal after making a cut-throat gesture to then-Eagle Mitchell White during the half-time break of the Essendon–West Coast clash in Round 15, 2000, also apparently mouthing the words "You... are... fucked!" to White.

In a famous game in 2004, with 35 seconds remaining and the scores deadlocked at 131 points apiece, Essendon legend James Hird swooped on a loose ball in the right forward pocket and snapped a match-winning goal with his 15th possession for the quarter, famously hugging an Essendon supporter in the crowd in a moment of jubilation after being fined $20,000 earlier in the week for criticising umpire Scott McLaren. Full-forward Matthew Lloyd also kicked eight goals during the game to net three Brownlow votes. Despite Hird's incredible individual effort, and to the consternation of fans and the audience of the 2004 Brownlow medal count, he did not receive any Brownlow Medal votes from the umpires for his 34 disposals and clutch goals, which some have speculated was in retribution for his tirade against umpire McLaren.

Brisbane Lions v Port Adelaide
The rivalry between the Brisbane Lions and Port Adelaide can be traced back to July 1996 when the Fitzroy Football Club and the Brisbane Bears merged to form the Brisbane Lions as Port Adelaide were due to enter the AFL with the Brisbane Lions in 1997. Fans of both Fitzroy and the Brisbane Bears were disappointed at losing their clubs as standalone entities, and a rivalry quickly developed between the newly merged club and Port.

In their first season in 1997, both clubs played in close encounters. Firstly, Port beat the Lions by 2 points in Round 5 at Football Park before the two sides played out a draw in Round 20 at The Gabba, but Brisbane would have the last laugh as they advanced into the finals at the expense of Port Adelaide on percentage.

The rivalry escalated in the early 2000s as both sides were constantly in premiership contention and played in many close games against each other, with the rivalry reaching its peak in the 2004 AFL Grand Final when Port denied Brisbane the opportunity to win four premierships in a row to equal Collingwood's four premierships in a row from 1927 to 1930. Afterwards, the rivalry died down before re-igniting in 2020 as both sides again were premiership contenders that year.

Western Bulldogs v Greater Western Sydney 

A rivalry between the Western Bulldogs and Greater Western Sydney has emerged in recent years.

The rivalry first started when Bulldogs captain Ryan Griffen controversially requested a trade to the Giants after the 2014 AFL season. The Bulldogs responded by luring the Giants' no. 1 draft pick, first-year key forward Tom Boyd, on a 7-year deal worth $7 million. Griffen and Boyd were ultimately exchanged in the same trade deal.

The two teams then met in the 2016 AFL First Preliminary Final, in which the Bulldogs were attempting to make their first AFL grand final appearance in 55 years while the Giants were attempting to reach the grand final for the first time in their fifth season in the AFL. The Bulldogs won the match by six points and would later go on to win the premiership the following week, with Boyd named among the Bulldogs' best.

The rivalry was further exacerbated by an incident in Round 21, 2017, in which Giants small forward Toby Greene collected Bulldog Luke Dahlhaus in the face with his foot while flying for a handball receive. Greene avoided suspension for the incident.

Since then, the Giants have had a slight edge in matches against the Bulldogs, winning four of their last seven matches up to the end of the 2021 season. It wasn't until Round 22 of the 2019 season that the Bulldogs would defeat the Giants again, winning by 61 points after they had trailed by 15 points at one stage in the match. It was also the first time the two teams played each other at the GIANTS stadium since the 2016 preliminary final. Twenty days later, the Giants would get their revenge, defeating the Bulldogs in a fierce and at times violent contest by 58 points in the second elimination final to progress to a semi-final against the Brisbane Lions at the Gabba and end the Bulldogs' season.

Local derbies
There are four "local derbies" in the AFL, with each of the clubs competing against their cross-town rivals at least twice every year.

Western Derby: Fremantle Dockers v West Coast Eagles

The two Western Australian-based teams contest the Western Derby. The West Coast Eagles won the first nine derbies, stretching from the inaugural derby in May 1995 until July 1999, but the Fremantle Dockers managed a seven-match consecutive winning streak in derby matches, commencing in August 2007 and ending in May 2011. Of the 55 derbies played, West Coast holds a 33–22 advantage. The best-performing player in each Western Derby is awarded the Glendinning–Allan Medal.

Showdown: Adelaide Crows v Port Adelaide Power

The two teams based in South Australia, the Adelaide Crows and the Port Adelaide Power, contest the Showdown. The first Showdown occurred in April 1997, following the introduction of Port Adelaide into the league that year. Of the 52 Showdowns that have been contested, the Power sit on 27 wins, while the Crows trail on 25. The best-performing player in each Showdown is awarded the Showdown Medal. Following the death of the Adelaide's coach and assistant coach of Port Adelaide Power for 11 years, Phil Walsh, the Showdown Medal was renamed after Walsh for this year to commemorate his life. It was the highest-attended game between the two teams, and the lowest-ever margin. Adelaide won 116–113.

QClash: Brisbane Lions v Gold Coast Suns

The QClash is a derby between the only two Queensland clubs. The Gold Coast Suns won the first QClash, held in 2011, by eight points, but the Brisbane Lions have dominated the rivalry, leading the head-to-head tally 15–6 as of the end of the 2021 season. The best-performing player in each QClash is awarded the Marcus Ashcroft Medal.

Battle of the Bridge: Greater Western Sydney Giants v Sydney Swans

The best-performing player in each derby is awarded the Brett Kirk Medal. The Sydney Swans have dominated most of the rivalry, holding a 13–9 advantage over the Giants and winning six of the sixteen games by at least 30 points; however, the tide has turned in recent times, with the last 18 meetings being evenly split since the start of 2014, with the Giants winning a historic qualifying final in 2016 as well as elimination finals in 2018 and 2021. As of the end of the 2021 season, GWS's last three victories over Sydney were by 2 points, 2 points, and 1 point.

Recent rivalries

West Coast v Sydney

A rivalry between the Sydney Swans and the West Coast Eagles developed during the first decade of the 2000s due to an unusually high number of close games, many in finals. The teams met each other six times between September 2005 and March 2007, including both Grand Finals and two Qualifying Finals; the final margins of these games were: 4, 4, 2, 1, 1 and 1, with Sydney winning the 2005 Grand Final after a 72-year drought—which was the longest gap between premierships in VFL/AFL history—and West Coast winning the 2006 Grand Final. The sum of margins of 13 points across six consecutive meetings is by far the narrowest in VFL/AFL history, with 28 points (South Melbourne vs Melbourne, 28 points, 1898–1900) the nearest challenger for six consecutive games. In Round 4, 2008, the era of consistently close games came to an end when the Swans smashed the Eagles by 62 points.

West Coast v Collingwood
The rivalry between the West Coast Eagles and Collingwood Magpies stems from a series of finals matches after the VFL became the AFL, with its roots in the 1990 Qualifying Final in which West Coast and Collingwood drew the match, requiring a replay the following week. The two sides drew a final on another occasion in 2007, which went into extra time (as the replay system for finals other than the grand final having been abolished by this point), with Collingwood winning. They have met 8 times in finals since 1990, including a 2-point victory by the Eagles in the 1994 Qualifying Final. The clubs met for the first time in a Grand Final in 2018, with the Eagles winning by 5 points to claim their fourth premiership after a heroic Dom Sheed goal. The two clubs also share a common coach in Mick Malthouse, who led West Coast to their first two flags in 1992 and 1994 and took Collingwood to their 15th and most recent premiership in 2010. After the 2018 Grand Final, the pair met at Optus Stadium, where Collingwood upset the Eagles to claim a 1-point victory. The most recent finals meeting between the two was the 2020 Elimination Final, in which Collingwood (labelled the 'Dirty Pies' by Western Australian media) pulled off a huge upset to once again claim a 1-point victory in Perth and progress to the semi-final.

Brisbane Lions v Collingwood
Angst between supporters of Collingwood and Brisbane had been caused by plenty of history between the two clubs, despite the Brisbane Lions having a relatively short existence as a merged club. Pre-merger Fitzroy was a neighbouring suburb to Collingwood, with the boundary being based on Smith Street, along with the fact that Fitzroy and Collingwood topped the VFL/AFL premiership tally during the early existence of what was then the VFL competition. There was also animosity between the Brisbane Bears and the Magpies after the Bears' number-one draft pick Nathan Buckley famously defected to Collingwood after one season on the Bears' list, citing that he wanted to win premierships and play finals footy, and that Brisbane had no future. The Bears also lost their final regular-season match in their final season (1996) to the Magpies, costing the Bears the minor premiership that season. However, the rivalry between the Lions and the Magpies was properly ignited post-merger; it began in late 1999 when Collingwood played their last-ever VFL/AFL game at their spiritual home ground, Victoria Park, with the Lions emerging 42-point victors that day and consigning the Magpies to their second wooden spoon in their VFL/AFL history that day. The rivalry between the two clubs went to the next level as the clubs played off in two consecutive Grand Finals in 2002 and 2003, with the Lions emerging victors on both occasions. These grand final results further fuelled the hatred that Collingwood supporters have towards the Brisbane Lions to this day despite the Lions having a poor decade on the field after their golden era.

Hawthorn v Sydney 
Starting in 2011, these two clubs share a heated rivalry and have met four times in do-or-die games in the finals: in the 2011 Semi-Final, which Hawthorn won; the 2012 Grand Final, which was won by Sydney; the 2013 Qualifying Final, won by Hawthorn; and the 2014 Grand Final, which was won by Hawthorn. The rivalry is amplified by players who have moved between the two teams, most notably Lance Franklin to Sydney in 2013 and Tom Mitchell to Hawthorn in 2016. Regular-season games are often close matches, with single-digit margins common. In round 23, 2018 (the final round of the home and away season) Sydney lost to Hawthorn at the SCG by 9 points. This was an important game as the winner would get the double chance and play in the top 4.

St Kilda v Geelong
While the St Kilda Football Club has tasted little success in the history of Australian Rules football, only acquiring one premiership in 1966 against the Collingwood Football Club, St Kilda has been a strong team in the modern era of the AFL. This is demonstrated no better than the clashes with Geelong during the 2000s and 2010s. In the seasons between 2005 and 2011, both clubs were powerhouses, with St Kilda and Geelong both at the top of the AFL ladder during the 2009 home-and-away season. Both teams, still undefeated after 13 matches so far in the season, would finally meet in Round 14 at Docklands Stadium. This match, which broke the stadium's record of attendance for a home-and-away match, would be known as one of the most famous regular-season matches in AFL history. The game also broke the record set in Round 8, 1991, between West Coast and Essendon, as being the latest game into a season that two undefeated teams had played against each other. St Kilda narrowly defeated Geelong and asserted themselves at the top of the ladder. These two teams would eventually meet again in the 2009 AFL Grand Final, but Geelong would defeat St Kilda this time in a gripping match that went down to the wire.

This rivalry would continue into the 2010–2011 seasons, and was still present in 2016, with the last three matches between the teams resulting in one win each for St Kilda and Geelong, with a draw in 2015. As of 2021, matches after this time period tended to be pretty lopsided in either direction.

Overall head-to-head results 
All clubs head-to-head win percentages. Includes all matches in the VFL/AFL. Correct to the end of Round 3 of the 2021 AFL season. *Does not include Brisbane Bears.

See also
 List of individual match awards in the Australian Football League
 Rivalries in the National Rugby League

References